Trinchesia anulata is a species of sea slug, an aeolid nudibranch, a marine gastropod mollusc in the family Trinchesiidae.

Distribution
This species was described from the Echizen Coast, Fukui Prefecture, north-west coast of Honshu, Japan. It has also been reported from the Izu Peninsula, Shizuoka Prefecture on the opposite coast of Honshu.

References 

 Baba, K. (1949). Opisthobranchia of Sagami Bay collected by His Majesty the Emperor of Japan. Iwanami Shoten, Tokyo, 194pp., 50 pls.

External links
 Baba, K. (1961). Three new species of the genus Catriona from Japan (Nudibranchia-Eolidacea). Publications of the Seto Marine Biological Laboratory. 9(2): 367-372 
  Burn, R. F. (2006). A checklist and bibliography of the Opisthobranchia (Mollusca: Gastropoda) of Victoria and the Bass Strait area, south-eastern Australia. Museum Victoria Science Reports. 10:1–42

Trinchesiidae
Gastropods described in 1949